This is a chronological list of all Tamagotchi virtual pets that have been released.

Original releases (1996–1998)

Global releases (2004–2008)

English releases (2004 – present)

Tamagotchi Connection Version 1

The "Tamagotchi Connection Version 1" was released in 2004 by Bandai America. It is the English equivalent to the "Tamagotchi Plus" released in Japan. Tamagotchi connection was considered a second generation to the previous releases in the '90s.

Bandai's new line of Tamagotchi Connections incorporated infrared technology, enabling connection with other Tamagotchis. This enabled features such as giving gifts, playing games, and mating with other Tamagotchi characters. A friend list icon was introduced in tandem with the connection feature; it recorded the Tamagotchi's friendship with a maximum of 50 Tamagotchi companions encountered via the connection. The Tamagotchi V1 was a hit and, consequently, Bandai America continued to release newer generations throughout North America.

Tamagotchi Connection Version 2

The Tamagotchi Connection Version 2 was released on June 21, 2005, in the U.S. It is roughly the English equivalent of the K-Plus, minus the cellphone connection features. The Tamagotchi Connection Version 2 features newer characters and ones taken from older releases, such as the Osutchi, Mesutchi, and the Original Tamagotchi.

"Gotchi Points", or GP, were introduced. GP are earned by playing the games and are used to buy items from a shop. The maximum number of GP that it is possible to earn is 9999. Caretakers can connect (using IR capability) with other users; the user is able to choose whether to play a game or give a presentation. The option to connect to either the original Tamagotchi Connection or Version 2 Tamagotchi was introduced. Five "codes" are available on the V2 that unlock special items.

Tamagotchi Connection Version 3

The Tamagotchi Connection Version 3 (also Tamagotchi Connexion Version 3 in Europe) was released on February 18, 2006. Like the Version 2, it borrows some features from the latest version of the Japanese toy, but greatly simplifies them. This means that the V3 does not go to school, get a career, or receive a salary. It debuted with seven new colors, adding many more designs later on.

The Version 3 unit has a little antenna on the top left side, similar to the Keitai Tamagotchi. The 'antenna' distinguishes it from the other versions. There are over 20 new characters, many from Osutchi, Mesutchi and the Keitai, thus bringing the total number of Tamagotchi Connection characters to 52. It is able to connect with Version 1 and 2, as well as other V3 Tamagotchi pets.

The Version 3 can also be used with Tamatown.com which generates codes which the user can input into the toy and receive souvenirs, which are items that the user can look at (but the Tamagotchi cannot play with). Passwords also give the shop items and food, which cost Gotchi Points. The Tamagotchi can eat the food that the user buys in Tamagotchi Town. Other than the code from the Nintendo DS Game, the passwords unlocked on the pet or on TamaTown.com will not work on any other Tamagotchi, thanks to the username system on both Tamatown and the Tamagotchi itself.

There are six new games, as well as new games that the Tamagotchi play with each other when connecting. The winner gets a certain number of points depending on what stage the connecting Tamagotchis are in.

Some souvenirs disappear after each previous generation, which is not a glitch but a feature. Souvenirs 2 (Town Hall Key), 3 (Key #2), 7 (Clean up game medal), and Souvenirs 18 to 21 (Arcade items players can win for free) disappear when the new generation appears. These are free items users can turn back on if they saved the passwords that turned them on in the first place. Souvenirs that users pay for with Gotchi Points (The Trip souvenirs) or donate points for (Ring, Cape and Crown from the Tamagotchi King) do not disappear.

Seven codes are available on the Version 3 that unlock special items, similar to the five codes for the Version 2.

Tamagotchi Connection Version 4 and 4.5

Tamagotchi Connection Version 4 has new connection options. Not only can the player go to this icon to connect to another Tamagotchi but can also use it to have their Tamagotchi go to school or to work.

The player can also use passwords to log into their computer to have their Tamagotchi in TamaTown which has info on the second paragraph. When the player wants to connect to another Tamagotchi they either can press V4 or Others. If the player presses V4 three options would pop up: Game, Present, and Visit. If the player chooses Games, the two Tamagotchi will compete in a randomly selected game for Gotchi points. If the player chooses Present, their Tamagotchi give the other Tamagotchi a gift. If the player chooses Visit, one Tamagotchi will go to the other Tamagotchi and spend time together. On the other hand, if the player chooses Others, they will be able to connect to the older Connections and the Tamagotchi Town. The "antenna" on this version is a star or, in Europe, a ball (like version 4).

It retains the feature of skill points, but has new types of them: Funny, Gorgeous and Spiritual. It has five games to play, like the V4: Climb, Tug-Of-War, Apple, Shapes (entirely different from the "Shape" from the V4) and Manhole. The baby takes about one hour to change into a toddler. From then, it takes about one day to change into a teenager. Then it takes about two days to change into an adult.  Like the features from Versions 2-4, V4.5 has secret codes that the player can enter into the Shop Keeper. The release date for the US was June 25, 2007.

Tamagotchi Connection Version 6 Music Star
Tamagotchi Music Star (billed as the Tamagotchi Connection Version 6 or V6 in the Asia/Oceania/Australia region) is a Tamagotchi released in North America on November 28, in Europe in January 2009, and in Asia/Oceania/Australia in February 2009. The Music Star features a 48×31 screen, similar to the one introduced on the Tamagotchi Connection Version 5, but the shell does not feature an antenna, much like the Tamagotchi Connection and Tamagotchi Connection Version 2. 12 designs are available in the United States, and 18 in the Asia/Oceania/Australia.
The Tamagotchi starts off with an instrument, toy, and some money. At the child stage, the Tamagotchi goes to preschool and receives a new toy. At the teen stage, they go to the Gotchi Performing Arts School (GPAS) and join a band with two other characters. The new band is taught by Classictchi until the band members reach adulthood.

As adults, they perform in front of a panel of judges. If any judge votes "no", the band can only do street performances until their next attempt. If the judges all vote "yes", the band debuts as a professional band.

TamaTown by Tamagotchi
This product line was first released in Fall 2010, featuring a larger Tamagotchi unit, or the Tama-Go, along with Gotchi Figures to plug into the Tama-Go. The TamaTown website, formerly known as "Music City", is now used for both the Tamagotchi Music Star and the Tama-Go.

The TamaTown Tama-Go includes a four-shade grayscale LCD screen, unlike the full-color screen of the Tamagotchi +Color or iD. Instead of using CR2032 batteries, like previous Tamagotchi devices, the Tama-Go is powered by 2 AAA batteries. The Tama-Go attempts to mimic the functions of the +Color, offering features like customization of one's house. This release has greatly increased in size, taking on an egg-shaped form-factor as opposed to the thin and portable Tamagotchi of previous releases.

TamaTown Character Figures are electronic cartridges designed for the TamaTown Tama-Go. One kind, "lite figures", contain just one game, and are included with the Tama-Go. Full Character Figures contain two games and a shop for the Tama-Go unit.

Bandai's North American division sold the TamaTown Tama-Go in the United States and Canada, while Bandai UK sold the toy line in the United Kingdom. The toy company Long Jump sold a version of the TamaTown Tama-Go in Brazil under license; the packaging of this version is slightly different from that of Tama-Go toys sold by Bandai America and Bandai UK.

In February 2013, TamaTown was shut down, likely in favor of Tamagotchi Friends. Many Tamagotchi fans reacted poorly to the shutdown, and a Change.org petition was also made to bring it back up, currently having more than 1,110 signatures.

Tamagotchi iD L
This Tamagotchi is similar to the original iD, but has more features including the ability to clean the Tamagotchi's house, visit and share a meal with the Tamagotchi's parents and grandparents. It can also connect to Japanese cell phones like the iD. Many new characters were added. This is the first Tamagotchi toy with a full-color screen to be released in both Japanese and English, though the English version is only sold in China and additionally was sold at Harrods in the United Kingdom.

Tamagotchi Friends
Tamagotchi Friends is similar to Tamagotchi P's, but with a grayscale screen. It was released first in the UK on December 26, 2013. The RRP in this market is £24.99. Later, the product was given a North American release in August 2014, exclusive to Toys R Us stores in this territory. It has already been released in the Netherlands, Poland and Spain.

In 2015, an upgrade was released, known as "Tamagotchi Friends: Dream Town Digital Friend." It retains most features of Tamagotchi Friends while adding new features, but it can only be bought at online stores, primarily due to the lack of retailer interest in the product.

Tamagotchi On

The Tamagotchi On was released in North America on July 28, 2019. It is the English equivalent to the "Tamagotchi Meets" released in Japan on November 23, 2018. It is the first widespread Tamagotchi release in the west to feature a color screen, along with the ability to connect to a mobile device using an app. It was discontinued due to the app closing down in 2022.

Tamagotchi Pix

The Tamagotchi Pix was released on July 1, 2021. It includes a camera on the device that can be used to take pictures and access special features. Additionally, the three front buttons have touch sensitivity which enhance gameplay. The release was available in purple sky or pink floral designs and blue and green variation.

There is a other variant called Tamagotchi Pix Party that comes in blue and pink confetti or pink and purple balloons with a new party option which has a cooking mini game, a camera mode where you take pictures with invited party guests, a dj mini game and a bingo mini game and a gift exchange mini game.

Modern releases exclusive to Japan (2004 – present)

Keitai Kaitsuu Tamagotchi Plus
The Keitai Kaitsuu Tamagotchi Plus, known as the K-Plus, is capable of connecting to Japanese mobile phones. In order to connect the Tamagotchi with cell phones, cell phone users first have to download a Tamagotchi game onto their phone. Afterwards, when connecting, the Tamagotchi could do many things, such as visit its parents, play games, and even find a mate. It connects to the original Tamagotchi Plus and the Deka Tamagotchi models. Ten-digit passwords unlock food from each region of Japan and items for the Tamagotchi. The K-Plus features old characters as well as new characters not in the original Tamagotchi Plus.

Tamagotchi Plus Akai

The Akai was released July 23, 2005 in Japan. It is similar to the Keitai Tamagotchi but it features a monochrome red LCD. There are new red-theme characters including a tomato, daruma, tengu, heart, and cherry, and new red-theme foods including pizza, wine, peaches, and red rice. The games are the same as the Keitai and Hanerutchi Tamagotchi with different graphics. It is capable of connecting with Japanese mobile phones, the Keitai Tamagotchi, Deka Tamagotchis at stores in Japan, the Home Deka, and the Hanerutchi Tamagotchi.

Hanerutchi

The Hanerutchi features characters from the Japanese show Haneru No Tobira ("You Knock On The Jumping Door") and a small number of Tamagotchi characters. It debuted in two colors with identical designs (white with green or red stripe and black), and a limited-edition metallic white with blue stripe was later released. It is similar to Keitai Tamagotchi with different characters.

Hanerutchi 2

This Tamagotchi is like the first Hanerutchi but is fashioned after the EnTama.

Chou Jinsei Enjoi Tamagotchi Plus

The Chou Jinsei Enjoi Tamagotchi Plus, commonly referred to as the EnTama, was released November 2005 in Japan. The design features a large antenna with a ball at the end, and a small strand of beads is attached rather than a key chain or mini-strap.

The Entama is the first Tamagotchi to remove two of the Tamagotchi's original primary functions: the discipline and the lights (the Entama turns the lights out on its own at night).

It is the first Tamagotchi with the ability to link to the computer. The user would be able to play with the Entama on the computer by going to E-Tamago. From there, the user can enter Tamagotchi Town and take part in many activities and play many games. The user can even shop and buy things for the Entama, which are received via 14-digit passwords.

The Entama included lifelike features, such as schooling and jobs (with job interviews). What jobs and what education the Tamagotchi receives are based on Skill Points (known as GUTS points), which can be raised by playing games, using items, and eating certain foods. The user can also cook by mixing certain ingredient items together. The foods created through cooking all raise certain skill areas.

There are a total of 58 characters featured on this Tamagotchi (42 Basic characters, three Secret Characters, two oldies, Oyajitchi and 10 Call Dating Service characters, also known as Hatenazoku characters). It includes three character groups: Intelligence, Style, and Kindness, also known as Mamezoku, Memezoku, and Kuchizoku, respectively.

Ura Jinsei Enjoi Tamagotchi Plus

The Ura Jinsei Enjoi Tamagotchi Plus, also known as the UraTama, is an Entama refresh released in June 2006. It features a monochrome blue LCD, unlike most Tamagotchi pets, and includes a star replacing the round decorative "antenna" and beads. Three special designs were released to commemorate the 10th anniversary of the Tamagotchi franchise.

TamagoChu

The TamagoChu is a minor Tamagotchi released at the end of January 2007 in Japan. TamagoChu's come in matching pairs, and with four different designs. The TamagoChu was mainly released for older audiences.

Unlike other Tamagotchi pets, virtually no care is required for the TamagoChu. There is no food, sickness, game, or bathroom functions. The user selects a teen character on each egg, who follow a linear growth. The TamagoChu include a fourth button (on the right side of the male egg and on the left of the female). Pressing the buttons together, the two eggs can communicate and develop a relationship. As the relationship grows stronger, the characters exchange items and grow up, having offspring and becoming old before leaving back to Tamagotchi Planet on a UFO.

Oden-kun Tamagotchi

The Odenkun was released on March 31, 2007, only in Japan, and features a shop owner. It is based on a Japanese cartoon, called "The Adventures of Oden-kun" in which all the characters are common Oden ingredients. The Tamagotchi has now ended production.

Royal Dream Family Tamagotchi Plus

The Royal FamiTama, as it is nicknamed, is a refresh of the FamiTama and was released March 29, 2008. Like the FamiTama, the Royal FamiTama has the option of a DVD, that will have new games and new items featured on it; 4 new games and 30 characters; it can connect with original FamiTamas and international equivalents; and includes about 60 new items.

Tamagotchi Plus Color
The Tamagotchi Plus Color (commonly abbreviated as TMGC+C) was a major turning point in the history of Tamagotchi, as it was the first ever Tamagotchi to have a full-color back-lit LCD screen. It debuted as a Japan-exclusive release on November 22, 2008, though a special release was held the week before. Compared to earlier versions, the shell is larger and thicker, and features a covered screen, much like the TamagoChu. The classic "cracked egg" design no longer borders the screen, but instead borders the Bandai copyright notice on the battery cover on the back. The TMGC+C maintains an infrared port at the top of the shell. It uses two AAA size batteries instead of the usual button cell batteries. 11 shell patterns are available: White, Pink, Magenta, Black, Blue, Orange, Green, Yellow, Navy, Green+White, and Cream+Pink.

A new function allows the character to leave their home and visit all parts of Tamagotchi Town on the device, as opposed to visiting locations through an online interactive website. Users can play games, visit stores, take walks, etc. Characters also get "dirty" over time, showing them brown on-screen, and cared for by using an icon shown as a shower head.

Since its release in Japan, many Tamagotchi fans outside Japan have put up protest sites featuring polls and surveys being sent to Bandai requesting them to distribute the TMGC+C in other countries.

EXmotchi
EXmotchi was a special edition of the TMGC+C, promoting the Japanese band Exile. There were two shell patterns: Red, and White. Both feature the name "EXILE" written above the screen and "TMGC" written below the screen. Other than a different shell pattern, the EXmotchi was exactly the same as a regular TMGC+C.

Hexagontchi
The Hexagontchi is themed on the Japanese quiz show "Quiz! Hexagon II". It is available in two shell patterns: Red+White, and White+Red. The Hexagontchi is similar to the regular TMGC+C except in order to extend the happiness bar, a series of quiz-show-style questions must be correctly answered. It also features some hexagon-themed items and room styles.

Tamagotchi iD
The Tamagotchi iD has many new features such as changeable accessories, keeping the same character, mobile accessibility, downloadable items from the Tama-iD.com web site, a new 'friend' stage, photo studio, garden with a mail box and more new features. It was released on  November 23, 2009.

It includes many new characters, such as a popstar character, Lovelitchi, who has since become the Tamagotchi franchise's main female mascot.

Tamagotchi iD L 15th Anniversary Version
The Tamagotchi iD L 15th Anniversary Version, a refresh of the Tamagotchi iD L. It was released to commemorate the 15th anniversary of the Tamagotchi franchise. Some of the characters on the Tamagotchi iD L are replaced by other ones selected by a poll on the Japanese Tamagotchi official website.

Tamagotchi Nano
The Tamagotchi Nano is the successor to the older Chibi Tamagotchi or Tamagotchi Mini, it features a larger screen, and new characters such as Spaceytchi, the main antagonist of the Tamagotchi! Anime, and Lovelitchi, in addition, you can attach them to the back of your Tamagotchi iD.
The Tamagotchi Nano has very few characters. It is meant to be the Tamagotchi ID's accessory. Unlike other Tamagotchi devices, the baby boy is white and the baby girl is white.

Tamagotchi P's
The Tamagotchi P's was a new successor to the Tamagotchi iD L, released in November 2012, and features pink, purple, blue, white, yellow and green designs. The new series is set in Dream Town unlike the previous series, which is meant to coincide with the Tamagotchi! YumeKira Dream Anime, and has 32 new characters and new group activities accessed through connecting with up to 3 other users. In addition, it has compatibility with the Tama Deco Piece, special pins that are sold separately. These pins attach to the top slot of the Tamagotchi P's, allowing to access through new characters and content. Tama Deco Pieces include Love & Melody, Tama-Star Circus, Royal, Melody Land, Fairy, Berry Sweets, Baby, Aikatsu!, Dream Coffret, Dream to Change, Sanrio, CIÀO, Miracrise, Disney, 17th Anniversary, and Nameko Nnf Nnf.

Tamagotchi 4U
The successor to the Tamagotchi P's, the Tamagotchi 4U (4U stands for Utility. Unique. United. Universal.) is the new model of the Tamagotchi released on September 27, 2014, with four colors, Pink, Blue, White and Purple. Unlike the other versions, the 4U removes the infrared sensor and implements the Near-Field Connection first seen in both the iD L and Friends. The near field connection is only used when the 4U syncs with a designated "touch spots", located all over Japan in order to download special items and content to the 4U.

The 4U is set in DoriTama Town and the number of characters included is only 10 with other characters available only for download through NFC connectivity. An official App for Android only is also released to synch with the 4U, allowing for more downloadable content. The Tamagotchi 4U sold rather poorly due to the removal of the infrared sensor and the small amount of in-device content.

Tamagotchi 4U+
The Tamagotchi 4U+ (たまごっちフォーユープラス Tamagotchi Fōyū Purasu) is a Tamagotchi virtual pet released on July 18, 2015, for a starting price of 5,980 yen (US$48). It is an upgrade of the Tamagotchi 4U with new characters and features. Because the Tamagotchi 4U+ features NFC, it retains the feature of Touch Spots for extra items and NFC communications with other devices. The Tamagotchi 4U+ features 2 baby characters, 4 child characters, 12 adult characters, and 20 Personality Stage forms making a grand total of 38 built-in characters, as opposed to the Tamagotchi 4U's grand total of 32 built-in characters. This does not include downloadable characters.

Tamagotchi m!x
The Tamagotchi m!x (たまごっちみくす Tamagotchi Mikusu) is a Tamagotchi virtual pet released in Japan on July 16, 2016. The toy introduced a new feature called "m!x". With this feature, when two Tamagotchis mate, their offspring's physical traits are based on the parents' traits and the m!x is set in My Town.

Bandai has released several different m!x versions. The first two versions are the Spacy m!x and Melody m!x. The pattern on the front of the device varies between the two versions. Spacy m!x version has a zigzag stripe pattern while Melody m!x version has one with spots. Both versions come in three colors: pink, purple, and blue. A third version, the 20th Anniversary m!x, was released to celebrate the 20th anniversary of the Tamagotchi franchise. The anniversary m!x features a falling star design and comes in two colors, Royal Pink and Royal White. In 2017 a fourth version, Tamagotchi m!x Sanrio Characters, was released in collaboration with Sanrio, featuring characters like Hello Kitty. Two versions of the Sanrio Tamagotchi were released.
A yellow version, and a pink limited version by Toys R Us Japan that came in a special gift package and was only available during the holiday season of 2017.

Tamagotchi Meets

The Tamagotchi Meets (たまごっちみーつ Tamagotchi Miitsu) is a new range of Tamagotchi devices which released in Japan in November 2018. The user can connect with the Tamagotchi Meets App to mix with other users all over the world.

Tamagotchi Smart
The Tamagotchi Smart is a rechargeable Tamagotchi you can wear as a smart watch hence the name Tamagotchi Smart, it had many collaborations such as Tamagotchi Smart Sanrio edition, Disney Pixar edition, NiziU edition, Once Piece and a PUI Pui Tamagotchi Smart card.

The Tamagotchi Smart has a touch screen which you can use to pet your tamagotchi, or use it for mini games. The tamagotchi smart also has a step tracker that can also be used for mini games.

The Tamagotchi Smart cards are like USBs that can be used to download additional content on the tamagotchi such as new characters or mini games or items.

Related accessories

Arukotch
Arukotch is not exactly a virtual pet, unlike most Tamagotchi releases. It is a combination of a pedometer and a game. When the user walks while wearing it, a character in the Arukotch called Arukotchi walks on the screen, and she may meet a boy Tamagotchi. Arukotchi may also find an item which makes her more attractive to the other Tamagotchi while she walks.

Mezamatch
Mezamatch is a combination clock and virtual pet. It resembles a large Tamagotchi. You can also save dates, such as anniversaries and birthdays, on the device.

Mechagotch
Mechagotch is a calculator. There are two modes which one can use it in, in addition to three games. One mode is a normal calculator, and one is a calculator with a Tamagotchi who reacts in different ways depending on the calculation. When one first uses this mode, there is an egg on the screen. It hatches into a different character depending on the last two or three digits in the answer to the first calculation which the user does in this mode. After the character hatches, the character reacts in different ways depending on the answer to the subsequent calculations. The numbers also show up in different ways depending on the character (for example, the answer might show up right away, or they might "spin" through several numbers in a similar way to a slot machine, depending on the character).

There are also three games. The first game is a kind of blackjack game, the second game is a game in which the player has to guess whether the number is higher or lower than the one displayed on the screen, and the third game is a memory game.

Deka Tamagotchi
These Tamagotchi were put in stores around Japan. The owner of a Tamagotchi could connect their Tamagotchi to get a special character on their friends list, and Keitais, Akais, TamaSukus, and Entamas could connect to buy items from the Deka. There are 4 main versions, Lotteria, Tamatama market, Game Station and Jukutama. There were not put for sale, but it is possible to buy them online.

Ouchi no Deka Tamagotchi (Home Huge Tamagotchi)
 is a version of the "Huge Tamagotchi" which could be bought by individuals for home use. It was released July 2005 in Japan. It includes a stand for tabletop display, three-position volume adjust, and requires 2 AAA batteries.

The player is a female Tamagotchi character that initially lives in a small house in TamaTown. Through playing games and banking Gotchi Points, one can upgrade their house several times, the result being a large Japanese-style palace. Each time an upgrade is performed, the capacity to keep various pets is increased. It is also possible to purchase a wide range of items to decorate the inside of the house, or to transfer over to the portable tamagotchi toys.

A special green-colored edition was sold at Japanese Toys-R-Us stores, available either paired with a matching Akai series toy or alone.

Tamagotchi Kakeibo
The Tamagotchi Kakeibo (超やりくりエンジョイ！たまごっちかけいぼ chō yarikuri enjoi! tamagotchi kakeibo) is an accessory for the Entama-generation Tamagotchi toys released in Japan.

It is slightly smaller than a home dekatama and very thin, as it is designed to fit into a small binder included with the toy. Inside the binder is a starter pack of "account book" (kakeibo) pages used to track the user's spending of "gotchi points", the currency used in all Tamagotchi toys. Initially released with a pink body and orange stylus, a later version released around the same time as the uratama features a blue body and green stylus, new screen background, and new binder cover (although with the same black-pixel LCD and programming).

The kakeibo is not really a virtual pet like the other portable tamagotchi, but more of a tool to assist with caring for them. Users play as Osewatchi (likely from the word o-sewa; help or aid), a female Tamagotchi who lives in Tamagotchi Town's Ginza district, which is the Tamagotchi Planet's version of the fashionable Tokyo shopping district. There are many stores which sell items users can transfer to their Tamagotchi pets, a bank to store money, as well as mini-games to earn that money and a library which can record which Tamagotchi characters players have discovered on their Entama and Uratama.

Tamagotchi "Music Fever"
The Tamagotchi "Music Fever" is a Tamagotchi that can record music off of CDs or cassette tapes. It is somewhat similar to the iPod. There are also a few games that can be played on the MusicFever device.

Tamagotchi School
, also known as TamaSuku (たまスク), was released in Japan on November 23, 2006, the same day as the franchise's 10th anniversary. It is the second Tamagotchi that is horizontal, first being Arukotch. It also is the first Tamagotchi to use a directional pad, and the second Tamagotchi to have only "select" and "cancel" buttons, the first being the Yasashii Tamagotchi. It can connect to other Tamagotchi Schools for playing games, the Entama and Uratama to gain new students and exchanging "Gotchi Points", Tamagotchi Station, Tamagotchi Station 2, the "jukutama" (a Deka Tamagotchi for Tamasuku) and an interactive website where players can compete against other players. 

The goal of Tamagotchi School is for the user to make their class a "supreme class" by enrolling new students, keeping up their popularity, and increasing their score in three main subject areas such as National Language (i.e. Japanese), Arithmetic, and Science. Just like the three different skill areas of the Entama, Uratama, and Hanerutchi 2, players can increase these by playing games or buying stat-boosting items. There are two versions of the Tamagotchi School, which differ only in the subject areas and the subject-related built-in games.

Furefure Tamagotchi
The Furefure is another large Tamagotchi that can be connected the Tamagotchi School, or as a Deka or Ouchi No Deka Tamagotch for the Tamagotchi School. It enables the students to play games. According to a translated version of the Tamagotchi Channel  it is a Tamagotchi based on club activities, e.g. football. It was released on April 28, 2007. The Furefure can also be referred to as a TamaFure.

Tamagotchi Restaurant
This Tamagotchi is different from previous models because it features both a 2D pixel screen and 3D playset. The toy comes in a flip-top compact that opens to reveal some Tamagotchi figurines. Placing them in different spots activates different actions. There are the traditional three buttons on the playset itself, along with the condiment buttons. The object of the game is to fill out orders. It was released July 28, 2007.

Tamagotchi no Fureai Furendo Chamametchi
This toy is a Chamametchi plush joined to her handbag featuring a small LCD screen. It is made to follow the story of Chamametchi playing with Mametchi's rocket, and flying to Earth. It was released July 27, 2008 in Japan only.

TamaWalkie
The TamaWalkie is a Tamagotchi Pedometer. It consists of either Mametchi, Memetchi or Kuchipatchi's ship landing in the United States after preparing the America Pavilon for the Tama and Earth Expo, and you must find the pieces of the spaceship. It seems to be only available in the Asia/Australia/Oceanic region.

Motto iD! Ouchi de Tamagotchi Station Plus
This only exists with Tamagotchi iD. You can communicate 3 Tamagotchi iDs and have a dance battle. This was released in 2010.

References

External links 

 

Releases
Bandai brands